Aattakatha  is a literary genre in Malayalam language consisting of the libretto used for the Indian classical dance drama kathakali. The word aatta-katha literally means "story for dancing and acting" (atu "to dance" + kathā "story"). 
The narrative framework of aattakatha consists quatrains in Sanskrit metres where the diction also is heavily Sanskritised; 
the dialogue part, however, is made up of padas, which can be set to raga (tune) and tala (rhythm) and have to be rendered by means of gestures and body movements by the actors while being sung by musicians from behind.

The origins of aattakatha literature dates back to the 12th century and it emerged as a literary genre in the 17th century. The earliest of the aattakathas is believed to be a cycle of eight Ramayana stories (collectively known as Ramanattam), composed by Kottarakkara Tampuran and about whose date there is an ongoing controversy. Next in importance are the works of Kottayathu Tampuran whose period is about the middle of the seventeenth century. Since the four aattakathas he wrote Bakavadham, Kalyanasaugandhikam, Kirmeeravadham and Kalakeyavadham punctiliously conform to the strict rules of kathakali, they are particularly favoured by orthodox artistes and their patrons. Another poet of this category is Irayimman Thampi (1783-1863). Unnayi Variyar’s Nalacharitham Aattakatha is one of the most famous works in this genre.

While Kathakali plays in their original form were designed to be performed over an entire night, over the years, they are performed in highly edited forms; often, only sections of the Aattakatha are performed, with non textual improvisations added.

List of Attakathas
Over the years, a large number of Attakathas have been penned. A list of some popular attakathas is given below:
Seethaswayamvaram
Balivadham
Thoranayudham
Kirmeeravadham
Bakavadham
Kalyanasaugandhikam
Kalakeyavadham
Keechakavadham
Uttaraswayamvaram
Dakshayagam
Narakasuravadham
Poothanamoksham
Banayudham
Kamsavadham
Balivijayam
Ravanavijayam
Ravanolbhavam
Nalacharitham
Rugmangadacharitham
Santhanagopalam
Subhadraharanam
Ambareeshacharitham
Karthyaveerarjunavijayam
Kiratham
Duryodhanavadham
Rajasooyam
Rugmineeswayamvaram
Lavanasuravadham
Karnasapatham

References

 Vellinezhi Achuthankutty (2013)|Kathakalppadangal, Thiranottam

Further reading
 
 Aimanam Krishna Kaimal. Attakkatha Sahithyam (study). Chapter 4 - Nalacharitham. State Institute of Languages, Kerala, 1998.

Literary genres
Genres of poetry
Indian poetry
Malayalam-language literature
Kathakali